Don't Push It is a Grand National-winning thoroughbred racehorse in England.

Debut 
Don't Push It began his career on 5 December 2004 at Warwick in a National Hunt flat race, finishing third.

2005–06 season 
His first full season began at Market Rasen on 24 September 2005 where he won a National Hunt flat race. Shortly before Christmas, he had his first start over hurdles, which he also won. However, he did not run again that season.

2006–07 season  
Early the next season, he had his first race over fences. He was again victorious and, for the first time, was partnered by AP McCoy. He was beaten next time out at Cheltenham in a Novices Chase by Denman, who won by a length despite veering dramatically left handed. A month later, Don't Push It returned to the course to record another victory over fences. His next run was in February at Chepstow, where he won by 23 lengths. He headed to Cheltenham for the Festival (Arkle Challenge Trophy) but fell when in with a chance. The race was won by My Way de Solzen. Don't Push It then tried again at Aintree and only beat one home, finishing fifth.

2010 Grand National
Don't Push It won the 2010 Grand National by five lengths ahead of Black Apalachi, giving AP McCoy his first win in the Grand National at his fifteenth attempt.

Retirement
Don't Push It's retirement was announced on 10 January 2012. O'Neill explained that the twelve-year-old "had not really been sparkling and the last thing we wanted was to make him carry on doing something he was not really happy with."

References

Grand National winners
2000 racehorse births
Thoroughbred family 6-d
Racehorses bred in Ireland
Racehorses trained in the United Kingdom
National Hunt racehorses